Golly is a tool for the simulation of cellular automata. It is free open-source software written by Andrew Trevorrow and Tomas Rokicki; it can be scripted using Lua or Python.
It includes a hashlife algorithm that can simulate the behavior of very large structured or repetitive patterns such as Paul Rendell's Life universal Turing machine, and that is fast enough to simulate some patterns for 232 or more time units. It also includes a large library of predefined patterns in Conway's Game of Life and other rules.

References

External links
 

Cellular automaton software
Cross-platform free software
Lua (programming language)-scriptable software
Software that uses wxWidgets